The violin octet is a family of stringed instruments developed in the 20th century primarily under the direction of the American luthier Carleen Hutchins. Each instrument is based directly on the traditional violin and shares its acoustical properties, with the goal of a richer and more homogeneous sound. Unlike the standard modern stringed instruments, the main resonance of the body of the violin octet instrument is at a pitch near the two middle open strings, giving the instruments a more balanced, clearer sound.

The instruments were proposed by composer Henry Brant in 1957 and the first octet was completed in 1967.

Instruments

The instruments of the violin octet are:

Note: While the Small Bass and Contrabass violins were designed and originally meant to be tuned in fifths, most bassists find the required extra shifting impractical. The New Violin Family Association lists tunings for these instruments in fourths, while the Hutchins Quartet retains the original fifths tuning.

Bows
Carleen Hutchins did not design specific bows for the instruments of the violin octet. This is important research which still has not been completed. Players of these instruments use a variety of violin, viola, cello and double-bass bows, looking for the best fit they can at the moment.

Performing groups
Currently, there are three performing groups which play and record on the instruments of the violin octet. The Hutchins Consort (based in San Diego, California) plays on Carleen Hutchins' instruments. The Hutchins Consort Quartet is a subset of the consort and plays on soprano violin, tenor violin, baritone violin and contrabass violin. The Albert Consort (based in Ithaca, New York) uses a set of instruments made by Robert Spear and the New Violin Family Orchestra, organized by the association Octavivo, which also uses instruments made by Robert Spear.

Use in traditional roles
The instruments of the violin octet do not necessarily have to be used in the context of the consort and for playing music written especially for them. They can also be used as alternatives to members of the usual violin family: for example any string quartet could be played by an ensemble consisting of two mezzo violins, one alto violin and one baritone violin, as an alternative to the two violins, viola and cello of the usual string quartet.

The best-known use of a member of the New Violin Family in this sort of role is that of an alto violin by Yo-Yo Ma to perform and record Béla Bartók's Viola Concerto.

Notes

References 
Carleen Hutchins' Instruments and Archives at the National Music Museum
Hutchins Consort, a performing group that uses the violin octet
Lipsett, Fred (2006). Yahoo!Groups Viola list message 42682 "Alto Violin" Retrieved March 24, 2006.

External links
Associations
 New Violin Family Association
 Octavivo (similar to the NVFA but on the East Coast; organizes the "New Violin Family Orchestra")
Instrument makers
 Robert J. Spear, New Violin Family instrument maker (Ithaca, NY)
 Luthier Joris Wouters, New Violin Family instrument maker (Westerloo, Belgium)
 a list of luthiers making instruments of the New Violin Family (all but one in the U.S.)

Violin family instruments